The 2010 Queen's Cup Final was the final match of the 2010 Queen's Cup, the 34th season of the Queen's Cup. The match was played at IPE Chonburi Stadium on 18 February 2010. The final and both semi-finals was broadcast live on the Siamsport TV. It was contested by Police United and the Krung Thai Bank-BG.

Match

Details

Road to Final

See also
 2010 Queen's Cup

2010
2010 in Thai football cups
February 2010 sports events in Thailand